Sardar Fazlul Karim (1 May 1925 – 15 June 2014) was a scholar, academic, philosopher and essayist in Bangladesh.

Early life and family
Sardar Fazlul Karim was born on 1 May 1925, to a lower middle class Bengali Muslim family of Sardars in the village of Atipara in Wazirpur located in the Backergunge District of the Bengal Presidency (present-day Barisal District, Bangladesh). His father, Khabiruddin Sardar, was a farmer, and his mother, Safura Begum, was a housewife. He had one brother and three sisters, and they grew up in the village.

Education
When Sardar was a high school student, Saratchandra Chatterjee's novel Pather Dabi (Demand for a Pathway) inspired him to dream of a revolution for the first time; his friend Mozammel Haq had given him the book. Young Mozammel, a political activist and journalist, died in 1965 Cairo plane crash. The book greatly influenced the teenaged Sardar. Years later he learnt that the same book had inspired Jyoti Basu to be a revolutionary. Sardar was always an obedient child and even helped his father in agricultural work.

After completing his matriculation, Sardar moved to Dhaka in 1940 to complete his Intermediate of Arts (IA) at the Government Intermediate College. Progressive students looked up to him. Sardar was more of a nationalist than a communist in those days. He brought out wallpapers and had a good personal library. Friends used to borrow books from him. Pearl Buck's The Good Earth also influenced him. In 1942, Sardar completed his IA, standing second place in the college.

Sardar Fazlul Karim became a student of Dacca University in 1942; he studied English for a few days but shifted to Philosophy because Haridas Bhattacharya's class lectures had attracted him. He topped the first class in his BA Honours in 1945 as well as in his MA examinations in 1946. The 1943's Bengal famine influenced him a lot. The communists were very active during the Bengal famine. Sardar left Socrates, Plato and Hegel in his room and travelled to remote villages with relief for the hungry!

Career
He became a lecturer in 1946 at the age of 21. Involved in progressive politics as a student, he was an "enemy" of the then Pakistan government and in four phases spent almost the full twenty-four years of Pakistani rule in jail. Ayub Khan and Monem Khan ensured that he could never return to his teaching job during the Pakistan period. He participated in the 58-day hunger strike of political prisoners demanding humane treatment. He was elected a member of Constituent Assembly of Pakistan while in prison. Bangabandhu Sheikh Mujibur Rahman and National Professor Abdur Razzak brought him back to the Dhaka University immediately after the independence of Bangladesh in 1972.

Sardar Fazlul Karim has written scholarly books on philosophy, among them being his দর্শনকোষ (Encyclopedia of Philosophy). He has translated Plato, Aristotle, Rousseau and Engels.

Published work

Bengali Translation:

References

External links 
 
 বিপ্লবীদের কথা ডটকমঃ সরদার ফজলুল করিম
 বিডিনিউজ টুয়েন্টিফোর ডটকমঃ সাক্ষাৎকারে সরদার ফজলুল করিম,বিষয়: অধ্যাপক আবদুর রাজ্জাক

1925 births
2014 deaths
People from Barisal
People from Barisal District
Bengali writers
Bangladeshi philosophers
Translators to Bengali
Bangladeshi translators
Recipients of the Independence Day Award
National Professors of Bangladesh
20th-century translators
Recipients of Bangla Academy Award
Pakistani MNAs 1955–1958
20th-century Bangladeshi philosophers
20th-century Bengalis